The Solectria Sunrise was an innovative electric passenger car, designed to be as efficient as possible to produce long range from available battery technology.

Created by Solectria Corporation of Woburn, Massachusetts (since acquired by Azure Dynamics Corporation), it was never produced beyond several prototypes, although significant effort was made to make the design worthy of mass-production—including crash testing.

The Sunrise is known for having achieved  on a single charge, during the 1996 American Tour de Sol competition. A Sunrise was driven  from Boston to New York city "on a single battery charge, negotiating everyday traffic and highway speeds up to 65 miles per hour" (104 km/h).

Specifications 

Body
Composite, monocoque unibody shell
Coefficient of Drag (Cd) approximately 0.17
Dimensions
length 176" (447 cm)
width 74" (188 cm)
height 52" (132 cm)
wheelbase 104" (264 cm)
Weights
curb weight without batteries 1433 lb (650 kg)
payload 682 lb (309 kg)
GVWR 2979 lb (1351 kg)
Drive system
50 kW Solectria AC induction motor, inverter, driving front wheels via Geo Metro transaxle
Batteries
24 GM/Ovonic Nickel metal hydride battery, 12v 90 Ah
Suspension
front: 1994 Geo Metro MacPherson strut
rear: 1994 Dodge Neon MacPherson strut
coil springs with airbags
manual Rack and pinion  steering
Brakes
manual, Geo Metro front disk, Dodge Neon drum rear
regenerative braking
Tires
13" Geo Metro tires
Performance
0–30 mph: 6 seconds
0–60 mph: 17 seconds
range, Nickel metal hydride battery: 400 miles (643 km) at 30 mph (48 km/h), 200 miles (321 km)at 60 mph (96 km/h).

Kit version 

In 2005, a single prototype as well as the moulds necessary to produce the composite chassis and body were sold and now belong to a hobbyist-led project to produce a similar vehicle as kits, to be known as the Sunrise EV2.  See Sunrise-ev.com.

See also
 Battery Electric Vehicles
 Solectria Force, a "conversion" vehicle from the same company.
 Aptera Motors, whose Typ-1 uses a drivetrain made by Azure Dynamics.

References

External links

 MIT Technology Review article from 1998
 Azure Dynamics website (Solectria merged into this company in 2005); now in partnership with Electro Autos Eficaces
 Web page for one of the original vehicles
 EV Discussion List page with 1997 press release

Electric cars
Production electric cars
Electric car models